Fanchang is a district in Wuhu, Anhui Province, China.

Notable places
The Fanchang Stadium is located in Fanchang District. It has a capacity of 12,000 and it is used mostly for association football.

Transport
Fanchang West railway station on the Nanjing-Anqing intercity railway

Administrative divisions
Fanchang District is divided to 6 towns .
6 Towns

Climate

References

Wuhu